The Improv is a comedy club franchise. It was founded as a single venue in the Hell's Kitchen neighborhood of New York City in 1963, and expanded into a chain of venues in the late 1970s.

History
Originally, it was a single venue founded in 1963 by Budd Friedman and his future wife, Silver Saundors, and located in the Hell's Kitchen neighborhood of New York City on West 44th near the southeast corner of 9th Ave. The Improvisation was originally an after hours coffee house where Broadway performers could unwind after shows with an open mic inviting impromptu musical performances. Gradually comedians would use it as a venue to try out new material and talent scouts from The Tonight Show Starring Johnny Carson and other New York-based television shows began frequenting the venue looking for new acts to book. After several years of alternating acts between singers and comics, by the 1970s it was a stand up comedy venue. A second location was opened in 1974 at 8162 Melrose Avenue in the Fairfax District of Los Angeles, California (which immediately prior housed the Ash Grove, a folk music venue). In 1979, Mark Lonow became a general partner and with Budd Friedman ran the Melrose club and oversaw the expansion of the single room as it became a successful chain. When the Friedmans divorced in 1981, the divorce settlement gave Budd Friedman ownership of the LA Improvs and Silver Friedman  was given ownership of the New York Improv. The original New York Improv closed in 1992.

In 1982, the L.A. Improv became the original site for the A&E Network television series An Evening at the Improv, running from 1982 until 1996, and was produced by Larry O'Daly, created by O'Daly and Barbara Hosie-O'Daly, with Budd Friedman as a warm-up host. Other locations have opened since then, such as in Tampa, Florida, Fort Lauderdale, Florida, Atlantic City, New Jersey, and Louisville, Kentucky. In 2014, Friedman sold the Improv chain to Levity Entertainment Group, now known as Levity Live.

Performances
The Improv was the place to see Richard Pryor, Robert Klein, Steve Landesberg, Bette Midler, Lily Tomlin, Jay Leno, and others when they were just starting out. Dustin Hoffman played piano there. On any given night in the later 1970s, one could see Gilbert Gottfried, Joe Piscopo, Bruce Mahler, Robin Williams, Larry David, and many others. Often famous comedians would walk in to "work out" before appearances on The Tonight Show. It was not unusual to find celebrities in the audience.

Nearly every big name in comedy has played The Improv, including Richard Belzer, Milton Berle, Kevin Brennan, Drew Carey, George Carlin, Andrew Dice Clay, Bill Cosby, Billy Crystal, Rodney Dangerfield, Jeff Dunham, Bill Engvall, Dave Foley, Jeff Foxworthy, Bill Hicks, Andy Kaufman, Carol Leifer, David Letterman, Richard Lewis, Jon Lovett, Norm Macdonald, Bill Maher, Marc Maron, Steve Martin, Dennis Miller, Larry Miller, Liza Minnelli, Freddie Prinze, Ray Romano, Paul Reiser, Joan Rivers, Joe Rogan, Jerry Seinfeld, Bo Burnham and Ron White.

Comedian Eddie Murphy was a regular at The Comic Strip in New York City, but in California performed at the Improv when he was only 15 years old, Jeremy Ruder at 18, and Jim Carrey at 19. Karen Black, Debra Winger and Barry Manilow among others worked there as waiters, waitresses, hosts or musicians before becoming famous.

New and upcoming performers have performed there as well. Comedy Central's Dave Attell frequents Improv locations in Tampa and Hollywood. Comics Lewis Black, Mike Birbiglia, Louis C.K. and Jimmy Fallon have performed at the Improv in Louisville, Kentucky.

Locations
The following is a list of Improv locations :

 Addison, Texas (Dallas area)
 Arlington, Texas
 Brea, California
 Chicago, Illinois
 Cleveland, Ohio
 Denver, Colorado
 Fort Lauderdale, Florida
 Hollywood, California
 Houston, Texas
 Irvine, California
 Kansas City, Missouri
 Miami, Florida
 Milwaukee, Wisconsin
 West Nyack, New York
 Ontario, California
 Orlando, Florida
 Oxnard, California
 West Palm Beach, Florida
 Pittsburgh, Pennsylvania
 Raleigh, North Carolina
 San Jose, California
 Stateline, Nevada (south shore of Lake Tahoe)
 Tampa, Florida
 Tempe, Arizona
 Washington, D.C.

The following is a list of former Improv locations:

 Atlanta, Georgia
 Atlantic City, New Jersey
 Baltimore, Maryland
 Las Vegas, Nevada
 Louisville, Kentucky
 New York City, New York
 Reno, Nevada
 San Diego, California
 San Francisco, California
 Schaumburg, Illinois
 Seattle, Washington
 London, England

See also
 List of New York Improv comedians
 Traffic School by Improv

References

External links

 
 The Improv Atlanta
 Improv in Louisville, Kentucky
 Interview with Chris Albrecht

Comedy clubs in the United States
Landmarks in Los Angeles
1963 establishments in New York City
Comedy clubs in California